Platanthera unalascensis is a species of orchid known by the common names slender-spire orchid, Alaska piperia and Alaska rein orchid. It is native to much of western North America from Alaska to the southwestern United States, as well as eastern sections of Canada and the Great Lakes. It can be found in forest, woodland, and scrub habitat, often in dry areas. This orchid grows erect to about 70 centimeters in maximum height. The basal leaves are up to 15 centimeters long by 4 wide. Leaves higher on the stem are much reduced. The upper part of the stem is a slender, spikelike inflorescence of widely spaced translucent green flowers. The flowers are fragrant in the evenings, with a musky, soapy, or honeylike scent. The plant is variable in size, stem thickness, density of inflorescence, petal shape, and scent. Plants of the coast ranges and the Pacific Northwest are stouter and have broader sepals and petals than do interior and montane forms.

References

External links
 
 
 Jepson Manual Treatment
 USDA Plants Profile
 Photo gallery

unalascensis
Orchids of Canada
Orchids of the United States
Flora of Alaska
Flora without expected TNC conservation status